The 1997 Kilkenny Intermediate Hurling Championship was the 33rd staging of the Kilkenny Intermediate Hurling Championship since its establishment by the Kilkenny County Board in 1929. The championship began on 15 August 1997 and ended on 19 October 1997.

The final was played on 19 October 1997 at Nowlan Park in Kilkenny, between Ballyhale Shamrocks and Graignamanagh, in what was their first meeting in a final in this grade in 23 years. Ballyhale Shamrocks won the match by 4-12 to 3-07 to claim their second championship title overall and a first title since 1974.

Graignamanagh's John Carroll was the championship's top scorer with 4-25.

Results

First round

Relegation playoffs

Quarter-finals

Semi-finals

Final

Championship statistics

Top scorers

Top scorers overall

References

Kilkenny Intermediate Hurling Championship
Kilkenny Intermediate Hurling Championship